Helge Lennart Jonsson (born 11 June 1933) is a retired Swedish sprinter. He competed in the 200 m and 4 × 400 m relay events at the 1960 Summer Olympics, but failed to reach the finals. He won a bronze medal in the relay at the 1958 European Athletics Championships, as well as the national titles in the 400 m (1959) and 4 × 400 m relay (1958 and 1959). After retiring from competitions he was treasurer of the Swedish Athletics Association for many years.

References

1933 births
Living people
Swedish male sprinters
Olympic athletes of Sweden
Athletes (track and field) at the 1960 Summer Olympics
European Athletics Championships medalists
People from Västervik Municipality
Sportspeople from Kalmar County
20th-century Swedish people